The following is a list of countries by telephone exports. Data is for 2012, in millions of United States dollars, as reported by The Observatory of Economic Complexity. Currently the top twenty countries are listed.

References
atlas.media.mit.edu - Observatory of Economic complexity - Countries that export Telephones (2012)

Telephone
Telephony